The Gentry is a Thoroughbred racehorse who won the New Zealand Derby in 1988.

Born in 1985, he is the only classic-winning son of the brilliant galloper McGinty who beat the best on both sides of the Tasman in his racing career and with an ounce of luck should arguably have been the first New Zealand winner of the Golden Slipper.

The Gentry showed promise at two, taking out the Group 3 Eclipse Stakes, but then lost his form for the best part of a year and, with the exception of a class 3 win at Tauranga, failed to finish in the first three for nine months.

But he bounced back to his best at exactly the right time, winning a three-year-old race at Ellerslie in late November before running second to Lou Morton in the Avondale Guineas and turning the table on that horse with a spectacular performance in the one that really matters, the New Zealand Derby.

After his Derby win he went on to record another Group 1 win at the same track, beating the excellent mare Maurine and Poetic Prince over 2000m in the New Zealand Stakes, but was disappointing in a subsequent Australian campaign.

Reference 

1985 racehorse births
Racehorses bred in New Zealand
Racehorses trained in New Zealand
Thoroughbred family 13-a